Reid Island is an island of the South  Atlantic Ocean at the east side of the entrance to Iceberg Bay, along the south coast of Coronation Island in the South Orkney Islands. The name "Reidholmen" appears in this location for a small group of islands on a chart drawn by Captain Petter Sorlle in 1912–13. Survey by the Falkland Islands Dependencies Survey (FIDS) in 1948–49 determined that only a single island exists.

See also 
List of antarctic and sub-antarctic islands
 

Islands of the South Orkney Islands